Brighton Heights Reformed Church is a Dutch Reformed church at 320 St. Marks Place in St. George, Staten Island, New York City. It is the second of two church buildings that have stood on the site.

The AIA Guide to New York City (1978) states that the original church was built in 1866, although the construction for the previous location began in 1818, and became independent in 1823, with one of its founding members being Vice President Daniel D. Tompkins.

The original building was added to the National Register of Historic Places in 1982. The current structure is not the one added to the NRHP. The original structure was destroyed in an accidental fire in the 1990s.

See also
List of New York City Designated Landmarks in Staten Island
National Register of Historic Places listings in Richmond County, New York

References

External links
Church website

Churches in Staten Island
Properties of religious function on the National Register of Historic Places in Staten Island
Gothic Revival church buildings in New York (state)
Churches completed in 1863
19th-century Reformed Church in America church buildings
Churches completed in 1866
Former Dutch Reformed churches in New York (state)
Building and structure fires in New York City
New York City Designated Landmarks in Staten Island
Church fires in the United States
1823 establishments in New York (state)
St. George, Staten Island